Meigs is a city in Thomas County, Georgia, United States, with a small portion extending north into Mitchell County. The population was 928 at the 2020 census, down from 1,035 in 2010.

History
The Georgia General Assembly incorporated Meigs as a town in 1889. The city is named after Josiah Meigs (1757–1822), American college professor, journalist, and president of the University of Georgia.

Geography
Meigs is located in northwestern Thomas County at  (31.072664, -84.090988). A small portion of Mitchell County within  of the center of town is also within the city limits.

U.S. Route 19 passes just east of the city limits, leading southeast  to Thomasville, the Thomas county seat, and northwest  to Pelham. Georgia State Route 111 passes through the center of Meigs on Marshall Street and Depot Street; it leads northeast  to Moultrie and southwest  to Cairo.

Demographics

2020 census

As of the 2020 United States census, there were 928 people, 394 households, and 235 families residing in the city.

2000 census
As of the census of 2000, there were 1,090 people, 399 households, and 286 families residing in the city. The racial makeup of the city was 66.79% African American, 26.24% White, 1.38% Pacific Islander, 4.77% from other races, and 0.83% from two or more races. Hispanic or Latino of any race were 7.61% of the population.

There were 399 households, out of which 35.1% had children under the age of 18 living with them, 35.6% were married couples living together, 31.1% had a female householder with no husband present, and 28.1% were non-families. 24.6% of all households were made up of individuals, and 9.8% had someone living alone who was 65 years of age or older.  The average household size was 2.72 and the average family size was 3.24.

In the city, the population was spread out, with 32.8% under the age of 18, 10.8% from 18 to 24, 25.8% from 25 to 44, 19.7% from 45 to 64, and 10.8% who were 65 years of age or older.  The median age was 31 years. For every 100 females, there were 83.5 males.  For every 100 females age 18 and over, there were 77.7 males.

The median income for a household in the city was $16,993, and the median income for a family was $20,046. Males had a median income of $18,594 versus $16,667 for females. The per capita income for the city was $8,104. About 36.2% of families and 45.4% of the population were below the poverty line, including 64.5% of those under age 18 and 28.9% of those age 65 or over.

In 2010, Meigs had the 14th-lowest median household income of all places in the United States with a population over 1,000.

References

Cities in Georgia (U.S. state)
Cities in Mitchell County, Georgia
Cities in Thomas County, Georgia